The Waist is the narrow neck of land between Herbert Plateau and Foster Plateau in northern Graham Land. Photographed by the Falkland Islands and Dependencies Aerial Survey Expedition (FIDASE) in 1956-57 and mapped from these photos by the Falkland Islands Dependencies Survey (FIDS). So named by the United Kingdom Antarctic Place-Names Committee (UK-APC) in 1960.

Isthmuses of Antarctica
Landforms of Graham Land
Danco Coast